The Royal Australian Navy Heritage Centre is the maritime museum of the Royal Australian Navy. The centre opened on 4 October 2005 and is located within the Public Access Area on the northern end of the Garden Island naval base in Sydney.

The need for such a facility was first recognised in 1922, by Vice Admiral Sir William Creswell who suggested the building of a museum to permanently display the Australian Navy's already rich and unique heritage. Since then, there have been several attempts to establish an international-standard naval museum.

The origins of the RANHC date from 2001, when the then Chief of the Navy commissioned a Naval Heritage Management Study to examine in detail how the RAN's past might best be used to support the present Navy's goals. One of the most important recommendations was the creation of a facility for the public display of the Naval Heritage Collection (NHC). Once approval for funding was received, a RANHC Project Board was formed and the project began on 24 May 2004. The NHC contains more than 250,000 individual items, and the mission of the RANHC is to display those objects of museum standard to the public, and through these displays capture something of the Australian naval experience.

Exhibits

The Professions of Navy
This is a large thematic display focusing on how the Navy's people have 'done the job' at sea over the years. Branches and categories past and present are used to explain how the naval profession has changed and developed.

The Periscope
This exhibit features a unique interactive display: a fully operational submarine attack periscope has been installed to allow visitors an unusual view of Sydney Harbour.

Naval Technology and Ordnance
A specific display illustrating how the Navy has developed and applied technology to the sea-fighting environment. It includes precision instruments for navigation and gunnery, in addition to examples of naval ordnance ranging from shells and torpedoes to modern guided missiles.

The Battle of Sydney
This centres on the fin and control centre from one of the Japanese midget submarines that attacked Sydney Harbour on the night of 31 May-1 June 1942, and also includes the Boom Boat belonging to the Maritime Services Board that first raised the alarm. The display is supported by an interactive audiovisual presentation.

In Which We Serve
This is a large chronological display of items that tell the stories of famous Australian ships and their battles. Artefacts are included from the colonial era, the First and Second World Wars, the Cold War and operations in the Persian Gulf.

Boats and Dockyards
The 1913 Boatshed has been dedicated as the display gallery for artefacts related to small boats and Australian dockyards, particularly Garden Island.

A Sailors Life For Me
This main exhibition display uses the entire mezzanine level of the workshop building, and provides visitors with an introduction to a sailor's life at sea. The display includes a mock-up of a World War II-era mess deck, as well as artefacts highlighting naval traditions and pastimes.

The Bridge
This is a mock-up of a Battle-class destroyer's open bridge, and is one of the major interactive displays in the centre. Using original equipment from 50 years ago, the Bridge is aimed at helping visitors acquire some experience of what takes place on a warship's bridge at sea.

Gallery

See also
Fleet Air Arm Museum (Australia), a museum at  focusing on the history of the RAN Fleet Air Arm

References

External links

 Royal Australian Navy Heritage Centre website

Museums in Sydney
Maritime museums in Australia
Naval museums
Military and war museums in Australia
Garden Island (New South Wales)